Waterloo is the name of a federal electoral district in the Waterloo Region of Ontario, Canada, that has been used in the House of Commons of Canada from since 1968 (from 1973 to 1976, it was known as Waterloo—Cambridge). Between 1997 and 2015, the riding was known as Kitchener—Waterloo.

Geography
The Waterloo electoral district contains all of the city of Waterloo plus the Bridgeport neighbourhood of Kitchener.

History

1966–1973

The Waterloo electoral district was created in 1966 from parts of Waterloo North and Waterloo South electoral districts. It initially comprised large sections of the Waterloo County (later Region) outside of the City of Kitchener, in particular in included, the City of Galt (now part of Cambridge), the City of Waterloo and the Townships of North Dumfries and Waterloo.

1973–1976

After the amalgamation of the City of Galt with the Towns of Preston and Hespeler into the City of Cambridge in 1973, the name of the electoral district was changed to Waterloo—Cambridge. The boundaries of the district were not changed to actually add the Preston and Hespeler asections of Cambridge into the riding.

1976–1996

In 1976, Waterloo—Cambridge was abolished when it was redistributed among Cambridge, Kitchener, and a new Waterloo electoral district.

The new Waterloo electoral district was created from parts of the Kitchener, Perth—Wilmot, Waterloo—Cambridge, and Wellington—Grey—Dufferin—Waterloo electoral districts. It comprised the Townships of Wellesley, Wilmot and Woolwich, the City of Waterloo, and parts of the City of Kitchener.

In 1987, the Waterloo electoral district was redefined to comprise the City of Waterloo, the northern part of the City of Kitchener, and the Township of Woolwich. The Townships of Wellesley and Wilmot were redistributed to the Perth—Wellington—Waterloo district.

The Waterloo electoral district was renamed to Kitchener—Waterloo and part of it was split into Waterloo—Wellington. The new district consisted initially of the City of Waterloo and the part of the City of Kitchener lying north of a line drawn from west to east along Highland Road West, Lawrence Avenue and Victoria Street.

1997-present

In 2003, the Kitchener part of the riding was redefined to be the part of the city lying north of a line drawn from west to east along Highland Road West, Fischer Hallman Road and the Canadian National Railway situated north of Shadeland Crescent.

Following the 2011 Census and a Canadian Parliament decision to increase the number of Federal electoral districts from 308 to 338, Elections Canada conducted a redistribution process that began with the establishment of Electoral Boundaries Commissions for each province in 2012. As a result of the work of the Electoral Boundaries Commission for the Province of Ontario, which was concluded in July 2013, a revived Waterloo was created out of 80% of the old Kitchener—Waterloo. The rest of the Kitchener-Waterloo riding was split between Kitchener Centre and Kitchener-Conestoga The revived riding comprised virtually all of the western portion of the old Kitchener—Waterloo, including all of Waterloo and a sliver of Kitchener lying north of the Canadian National Railway and northeast of Conestoga Parkway.

Members of Parliament
This riding has elected the following members of the House of Commons of Canada:

Electoral history

Waterloo, 2015–present

Kitchener—Waterloo, 1997-2011

					
					

Note: Conservative vote is compared to the total of the Canadian Alliance vote and Progressive Conservative vote in 2000 election.

Waterloo, 1976–1996

Waterloo—Cambridge, 1973–1976

Waterloo, 1966–1973

See also 

 List of Canadian federal electoral districts
 Past Canadian electoral districts

Notes

External links 

 Website of the Parliament of Canada
Waterloo Conservative Electoral District Association
Green Party of Canada - Kitchener-Waterloo
Waterloo Federal Liberal Electoral District Association
Kitchener-Waterloo NDP Federal Electoral District Association
Waterloo People's Party Electoral District Association

Ontario federal electoral districts
Politics of Kitchener, Ontario
Politics of Waterloo, Ontario